Maol may refer to:

People
 Maol Choluim I, Earl of Lennox
 Maol Choluim II, Earl of Lennox
 Maol Choluim de Innerpeffray
 Maol Chosna
 Maol Domhnaich, Earl of Lennox
 Maol Eoin Ó Crechain
 Maol Muire Ó hÚigínn, Irish Catholic clergyman
 Maol Ruanaidh Cam Ó Cearbhaill (died 1329)
 Maol Ruanaidh mac Ruaidhrí Ó Dubhda
 Maol Sheachluinn na n-Uirsgéal Ó hUiginn

Places
 Caisteal Maol, Scotland

Other
 MAOL table book